Anoushka is the debut album of Indian sitar player Anoushka Shankar, released in 1998. The pieces begin with a slow introduction of fluid rhythms (alap or aochar) and build in a crescendo to a spirited display of virtuosity with tabla accompaniment. Four of the album's five themes are based on ragas adapted by Ravi Shankar.

Track listing
All songs by Ravi Shankar, except where noted.

"Bairagi"  – 20:15
"Tilak Shyam"  – 10:35
"Kirwani"  – 8:46
"Charukeshi"  – 7:30
"Pratham Prem" (by Anoushka Shankar)  – 12:43

Personnel 

Anoushka Shankar: Sitar, tamboura, vocals
Sukanya Shankar: Tamboura
Bikram Ghosh: Tabla
Arup Chattapadhyay: Tabla

References

1998 debut albums
Anoushka Shankar albums
Hindustani classical music albums